Nuevo San Juan is a corregimiento in Veraguas Province in the Republic of Panama.

References 

States and territories established in 2012
Populated places in Veraguas Province